Olalekan Akinde Bola (born 10 February 1992 in Lagos) is a Nigerian footballer who is currently a free agent. He started his senior career at Ocean Boys FC.

Career
Bola began his career with the University of Lagos and moved 2008 to the Ocean Boys F.C., where he won the Nigerian FA Cup in his first season.

Honours
 2008: Nigerian FA Cup Champion

References 

1992 births
Living people
Yoruba sportspeople
Nigerian footballers
Ocean Boys F.C. players
Nigerian expatriates in Albania
Expatriate footballers in Albania
KF Bylis Ballsh players
Kategoria Superiore players
Association football forwards